Expeditie Robinson 2016 is the seventeenth season of the Dutch version of the Swedish television series Expeditie Robinson. This season premiered on September 8, 2016. The main twist season is that both tribes are staying on the same island.

Finishing order

Future Appearances
JayJay Boske returned to compete in Expeditie Robinson 2021. Thomas Dekker, Diorno "Dio" Braaf and Bertie Steur later returned to compete in Expeditie Robinson: All Stars.

References

External links
http://www.expeditierobinson.nl/

Expeditie Robinson seasons
2010s reality television series
2010s Dutch television series